Athyma sulpitia, the spotted sergeant, is a species of nymphalid butterfly found in tropical and subtropical Asia.

References

Cited references

Athyma
Fauna of Pakistan
Butterflies of Asia
Butterflies described in 1779